The 21st Empire Awards ceremony (officially known as the Jameson Empire Awards), presented by the British film magazine Empire, honored the best films of 2015 and took place on 20 March 2016 in London, England.
Star Wars: The Force Awakens was the most awarded film with five winnings, including Best Director. Other winners included Mad Max: Fury Road, with four awards, and the two times winner Spectre. The honorary awards were given to Alan Rickman, Stanley Tucci and Paddy Considine.

Winners and nominees
Winners are listed first and highlighted in boldface.

Multiple awards
The following films received multiple awards:

Multiple nominations
The following films received multiple nominations:

References

External links
 

Empire Award ceremonies
2015 film awards
2016 in London
2016 in British cinema
March 2016 events in the United Kingdom